Koonamthai is an area in the city of Kochi in Kerala, India. Situated around 8 km from the city centre, it is one of the wards in Kalamassery municipality.

References 

Villages in Ernakulam district